Gloriana de Jesús Villalobos Vega (born 20 August 1999) is a Costa Rican football midfielder. In 2014, she debuted for the Costa Rica national team at the age of 14.

College Career
In 2017, Villalobos was named to the All-ACC Third Team, as well as being chosen to the 11-member All-Freshman Team. Villalobos played in all 21 matches for Florida State where she scored 1 goal and made 2 assists. Gloriana left FSU in September 2019 to play with Saprissa.

Professional career

Villalobos debuted for local club Saprissa in 2012 at the age of 12.

Gloriana played with Saprissa on 2019 and lost the final match against Alajuela. After the season ended she signed with Club Sport Herediano and is playing with them since 2020.

International play

In January 2014, Villaobos—yet to turn 15—led Costa Rica to qualification for the 2014 FIFA U-20 Women's World Cup, appearing in all five games at the 2014 CONCACAF Under-20 Women's Championship in the Cayman Islands.

She then shot to national prominence in March 2014, when Costa Rica hosted the 2014 FIFA U-17 Women's World Cup. She appeared in all three games as the country hosted its first FIFA event.

In May 2014, Villalobos received her first call to the senior national team in the Central American region of 2014 CONCACAF Women's Championship qualification, the first step toward the 2015 FIFA Women's World Cup. Villalobos scored in the final group game to help Costa Rica advance. In the playoff to determine which team advanced to the Pan American Games, Villalobos played again in a 3–0 Costa Rica win.

At the U-20 Women's World Cup in Canada in August 2014, Villalobos played all 270 minutes but Costa Rica was eliminated in the group stage again.

In 2017, Villalobos joined the Florida State Seminoles women's soccer team.

International goals

References

External links
 
 Profile  at Fedefutbol
 

1999 births
Living people
Women's association football midfielders
Costa Rican women's footballers
Footballers from San José, Costa Rica
Costa Rica women's international footballers
2015 FIFA Women's World Cup players
Pan American Games bronze medalists for Costa Rica
Pan American Games medalists in football
Footballers at the 2019 Pan American Games
Footballers at the 2015 Pan American Games
Central American Games gold medalists for Costa Rica
Central American Games medalists in football
Florida State Seminoles women's soccer players
Costa Rican expatriate footballers
Costa Rican expatriate sportspeople in the United States
Expatriate women's soccer players in the United States
Medalists at the 2019 Pan American Games